Inventing the Flat Earth is a 1991 book by historian Jeffrey Burton Russell debunking the notion that medieval Christians believed the Earth was flat.

See also
 Modern flat Earth beliefs
 Myth of the flat Earth

Sources

Notes

External links
Russell's summary of his book

1991 non-fiction books
20th-century history books
History books about Christianity
History of geography